Woman, Man, Life (Persian title:Zan, Mard, Zendegi- )  is a 2012 Iranian crime drama film directed by Mehdi Vadadi and starring Leyla Otadi, Sahar Ghoreishi, Amir Hossein Rostami, and Nima Shahrokh Shahi.

References

2012 films
2010s Persian-language films
2012 crime drama films
Iranian crime drama films